John Frowen (11 October 1931 – 28 August 2011) was a professional footballer who played for Cardiff City, Bristol Rovers and Newport County.

Born in Trelewis, Wales, Frowen began his professional career at Cardiff City after being spotted playing for local side Nelson. Graduating through the club's junior teams, he made his debut in a 1–0 defeat to West Bromwich Albion in September 1952. However, he struggled to hold on to a regular first team place due to the form of players such as Stan Montgomery and Danny Malloy. He left Cardiff in the summer of 1958, joining Bristol Rovers where he managed to become a first team choice for the club.

References

1931 births
2011 deaths
Welsh footballers
English Football League players
Association football defenders
Cardiff City F.C. players
Bristol Rovers F.C. players
Newport County A.F.C. players